Group Captain Desmond James Scott,  (11 September 1918 – 8 October 1997) was a New Zealand fighter pilot and flying ace of the Second World War. He was credited with the destruction of at least five enemy aircraft.

Born in Ashburton, he learnt to fly privately. He joined the Royal New Zealand Air Force (RNZAF) in March 1940. Arriving in Britain in September, he was attached to the Royal Air Force (RAF) and flew Hawker Hurricanes with No. 3 Squadron. Awarded the Distinguished Flying Cross and Bar for his service with the squadron, he later flew Hawker Typhoons in operations over the English Channel and Europe. In 1943, he commanded No. 486 Squadron, for which he was awarded the Distinguished Service Order, and then the Tangmere Fighter Wing. At the end of the year, he was appointed the station commander of RAF Hawkinge. While in this role, he rescued a pilot of a crashed and burning Supermarine Spitfire, and was made an Officer of the Order of the British Empire for this feat. He commanded No. 123 Wing during Operation Overlord and subsequent campaigns in France and the Netherlands. He ended the war as a group captain, the youngest man in the RNZAF to achieve this rank. After the war, he transferred to the RAF and served with Transport Command. He returned to New Zealand with his family in 1948 and retired from the RAF in 1949. He died in 1997, aged 79.

Early life
Desmond James Scott was born in Ashburton in the province of Canterbury, New Zealand, on 11 September 1918. His father, John Scott, was a shepherd but later moved his family to Cheviot, where he worked as a stock and station agent. Scott was educated at Cheviot School from 1929 and then from 1933, attended Cathedral Grammar School in Christchurch, as a boarder. Once his education was completed, he became a stock agent. He later worked as a salesman of agricultural equipment. He also served in the Territorial Force, joining the Canterbury Yeomanry in 1936 as a cavalryman. It was while he was on an exercise with the yeomanry, when his troop experienced a mock attack by Bristol fighters of the Royal New Zealand Air Force (RNZAF), that he resolved to learn to fly. He commenced flying lessons shortly afterwards.

Second World War
In March 1940, with the Second World War well underway, Scott joined the RNZAF. According to Scott, he had taken advantage of a scheme that provided government funds to private individuals for flight training in return for a commitment to serve in the military if called upon. On the outbreak of hostilities with Nazi Germany, the scheme compelled him to enlist in the RNZAF. He was sent for training to the RNZAF base at Wigram Aerodrome and in late 1940, with others from his flight school intake, he sailed to England as a sergeant pilot to serve in the Royal Air Force (RAF). After his arrival, he received further flight training at RAF Sutton Bridge, where he learnt to fly the Hawker Hurricane.

Service with No. 3 Squadron
Scott was posted to RAF Fighter Command, joining No. 3 Squadron, based at RAF Skeabrae in the Orkney Islands at the time. Not long after his arrival at the squadron, he helped recover the body of a pilot who had crashed on the airfield. He was reprimanded for this as he had left the cockpit of his Hurricane, idling on the airfield at the time, without permission. 

In the spring of 1941, No. 3 Squadron, commanded by fellow New Zealander Russell Aitken was transferred to Martlesham Heath, near Ipswich, and became part of No. 11 Group. The squadron commenced a variety of duties: fighter sweeps, attacks on enemy shipping in the English Channel, escort missions, and night-fighter duties. On 7 August 1941, while on a sweep over France, he claimed one Messerschmitt Bf 109 as probably destroyed and another damaged over Le Touquet. Soon afterwards, he was promoted to flight sergeant. Later in the year and into 1942, Scott flew several night intruder missions over the Netherlands; a Messerschmitt Bf 110 was probably destroyed on the night of 5 January, with his first confirmed destroyed enemy aircraft, an unidentified type, achieved nearly three months later, on the night of 26 March. By this time, he was a pilot officer, having been commissioned earlier in the year. In May, and now flying a Hurricane Mk IIC, he destroyed two more aircraft, one being a half share with another pilot, and two probables, one of which was a Junkers Ju 88 bomber. Another Ju 88 was claimed as damaged. The same month, he was awarded the Distinguished Flying Cross (DFC). The citation, published in the London Gazette, read:

In June, he made only one claim, for a damaged Dornier Do 217. Promoted to flight lieutenant the same month, in July, a Ju 88 was confirmed as destroyed over Nordwijk and another enemy aircraft as damaged. Made a flight commander in August, he was taken off operations the following month.

Squadron leader
Having been promoted to squadron leader, Scott was posted to Bentley Priory, the headquarters of Fighter Command, in a staff role for six months. While at Bentley, he was part of a group working on night-fighting tactics. During this time, he was awarded a bar to his DFC in acknowledgement of his service from June up until his departure from No. 3 Squadron. The citation, published at the end of September, read:

He was presented with his DFC and bar by King George VI in a ceremony held at Buckingham Palace in November. In April 1943, having ended his staff work at Bentley Priory, Scott attended a fighter leader's school and then converted to the Hawker Typhoon. At the time No. 486 Squadron was preoccupied with defensive duties, flying patrols to catch sneak raids mounted by the Luftwaffe. Implementing a high standard of discipline, he switched tactics, having the squadron attacking enemy shipping and carrying out offensive fighter-bomber operations over Europe.

Within days of taking over the squadron, Scott shared in the destruction of one Focke Wulf Fw 190 and the damage of another Fw 190 off Étretat. On 14 April, he shared in the destruction of a Bf 109. He was particularly remorseful on this occasion as he had fired on the pilot of the Bf 109, struggling to exit the aircraft before it plunged into the sea. He destroyed a Fw 190 on 25 May over to the south of Brighton, and a second late the next month off the Somme estuary. In July, he shared in the destruction of another Fw 190 near Le Havre. This was during a rescue operation, providing cover for a dinghy holding the crew of a British Vickers Wellington bomber that had crashed into the English Channel and which had been spotted by Scott's flight as they made their way to Le Havre to attack enemy shipping. The crew was later recovered. In early September, he received the Distinguished Service Order (DSO). The citation read:

Wing leader
The same month Scott's DSO was gazetted, he was promoted to the rank of wing commander and appointed leader of a fighter wing of three squadrons, one of which being No. 486 Squadron, at RAF Tangmere. In this role, he led the wing in fighter-bomber raids on targets in the northern part of France or escorted bombers. On 24 September, flying near Trouville, he claimed a Fw 190 as damaged. In November, he was rested from flying operations and posted as commander of the RAF station at Hawkinge. In January 1944, a Supermarine Spitfire crashed in flames on the station's airfield. Scott went to the aid of the pilot and extracted him from the burning aircraft. For this action, during which he received burns to his face and hands, he was later appointed an Officer of the Order of the British Empire (OBE). The pilot he rescued later died of his injuries. The published citation for the OBE read: 

In March, he was appointed commander of the newly formed No. 123 Wing, which operated Typhoons and was made up of No. 609, 164, 183 and 198 Squadrons. The wing flew in support of the invasion of Normandy and then Scott took his command, as part of the 2nd Tactical Air Force, to mainland Europe, firstly in France and then the Netherlands. When he was promoted to group captain in July, he was the youngest man to hold this rank in the RNZAF. Under his leadership, No. 123 Wing provided air support for the British during Operation Market Garden and for the Canadian infantry during the Battle of the Scheldt. For his services commanding the wing, he was mentioned in despatches. 

Scott finished his tour in February 1945, by now a married man. He had wed Joyce Marguerite  in December the previous year. His wife was present when he was invested with the DSO and OBE a few months later in a ceremony at Buckingham Palace.

Already one of New Zealand's most decorated fighter pilots of the Second World War, Scott was awarded the French Croix de Guerre as well as the Belgian equivalent. He also was appointed a commander of the Order of Orange-Nassau, a Dutch honour. He was credited with five aircraft destroyed, and a share in three more. He also had six probables, two of which were shared with other pilots, and five damaged with one more shared.

Postwar period
Scott was one of many pilots of the RNZAF who in the postwar period opted for a permanent commission in the RAF. He received a commission as a flight lieutenant from 14 August 1947 with his seniority dating from 1 September 1945. He retained his war substantive rank of wing commander but this was reverted to squadron leader later in the year. He was posted to Transport Command, where he was commander of the station at RAF Dishforth. He was later part of an RAF delegation sent to Greece, where he acted as an air advisory officer to the Greek Air Force. He retired from the RAF effective 28 February 1949, due to "medical unfitness", but by that time was already back in New Zealand.

Later life
Returning to New Zealand with his family in December 1948, Scott settled in Christchurch and became an importer-exporter. He was a member of the New Zealand Labour Party and was initially selected to contest the Christchurch electorate of St Albans for Labour at the  general election. However he ultimately did not stand in the election, and his replacement as the Labour candidate for St Albans, Neville Pickering, won the seat.

In 1972, Scott became married again, to Margaret Helen née Barrell; his first wife had died three years previously. He published an account of his wartime exploits, Typhoon Pilot, in 1982; it was well received by the public. He later followed this with One More Hour in 1989. He died in Christchurch on 8 October 1997, aged 79. He was survived by his second wife and the four daughters of his first marriage.

Notes

References

External links
 New Zealand Fighter Pilots Museum
 No. 3 Fighter Squadron Association

1918 births
1997 deaths
New Zealand Companions of the Distinguished Service Order
New Zealand military personnel of World War II
New Zealand Officers of the Order of the British Empire
New Zealand World War II flying aces
People from Ashburton, New Zealand
Recipients of the Croix de Guerre 1939–1945 (France)
Recipients of the Croix de guerre (Belgium)
Recipients of the Distinguished Flying Cross (United Kingdom)
Royal Air Force group captains
New Zealand Labour Party politicians